Bromus grandis is a species of brome grass known by the common name tall brome.

It is native to California and Baja California, where it grows in many types of habitat from forest to coastal scrub.

Description
It has hairy leaves and open inflorescences of fuzzy flat spikelets.

It is related to Bromus orcuttianus, which shares its range.

External links
Jepson Manual Treatment of Bromus grandis
USDA Plants Profile
Bromus grandis — Photo gallery

grandis
Bunchgrasses of North America
Native grasses of California
Grasses of Mexico
Flora of Baja California
Flora of the Sierra Nevada (United States)
Natural history of the California chaparral and woodlands
Natural history of the California Coast Ranges
Natural history of the Peninsular Ranges
Natural history of the San Francisco Bay Area
Natural history of the Santa Monica Mountains
Natural history of the Transverse Ranges
Flora without expected TNC conservation status